Eleanor Estes (May 9, 1906 – July 15, 1988) was an American children's writer and a children's librarian. Her book Ginger Pye, for which she also created illustrations, won the Newbery Medal. Three of her books were Newbery Honor Winners, and one was awarded the Lewis Carroll Shelf Award. Estes' books were based on her life in small town Connecticut in the early 1900s.

Life
Eleanor Estes was born Eleanor Ruth Rosenfield in West Haven, Connecticut. She was the third child of father Louis Rosenfeld, a bookkeeper for a railway, and mother Caroline Gewecke Rosenfeld, a seamstress and story teller. Estes's father died when she was young and her mother's dressmaking provided for the family. Eleanor Estes attributes her love of reading, children's literature, and storytelling to her parents' fondness for books and her mother's "inexhaustible supply of songs, stories, and anecdotes, with which she entertained us with while cooking dinner." In 1923, after graduating from West Haven High School, she trained at the New Haven Free Library, and became a children's librarian there.

In 1931, Estes won the Caroline M. Hewins scholarship for children's librarians, which allowed her to study at the Pratt Institute library school in New York. In 1932 she married fellow student Rice Estes. They both worked as librarians throughout New York, and he later became a professor of library science and the head of the Pratt Institute Library. Estes worked as a children's librarian in various branches of the New York Public Library, until 1941. Estes began writing when tuberculosis left her confined to her bed. Her best known fictional characters, the Moffats, live in Cranbury, Connecticut, which is Estes’ hometown of West Haven. She based the Moffats after her family, including patterning younger daughter Janey after herself, and basing Rufus on her brother, Teddy.

The Esteses had one child, Helena, born in Los Angeles in 1948, where Rice Estes was assistant librarian at the University of Southern California. In 1952 they moved back east and worked as librarians. Estes also taught at the University of New Hampshire Writer's Conference.

Eleanor Estes died July 15, 1988 in Hamden, Connecticut. Her papers are held at the University of Southern Mississippi, University of Minnesota, and the University of Connecticut. She wrote 20 books.

The Hundred Dresses 
Estes’s book The Hundred Dresses was a Newbery Honor Book in 1945. It spoke about the bullying of children based on their races and their nationalities. The book is about a young Polish girl named Wanda Petronski who is bullied by her classmates for her weird Polish name and the blue dress she wears every day. Wanda claims to have a hundred dresses at home and her classmates don’t believe her. After being pulled out of school by her father, Wanda wins a school art contest for her one hundred drawings of dresses. Her classmates felt regret about bullying her when they realized that it was their own faces drawn in the design of dresses by Wanda. Estes based the book on an incident from her own childhood, to atone for staying silent when a peer was bullied.

Awards

 Newbery Medal, 1952 – Ginger Pye
 Newbery Honor Books – The Middle Moffat, Rufus M., The Hundred Dresses 
 Lewis Carroll Shelf Award, 1961 – The Moffats 
 Certificate of Award for Outstanding Contribution to Children’s Literature, 1968 
 Pratt Institute Alumni Medal, 1968 
 Laura Ingalls Wilder Award Nominee, 1970

Reception
According to reviewer Carolyn Shute, Estes had the "ability to distill the very essence of childhood." Anita Silvey said she possessed a "rare gift for depicting everyday experiences from the fresh perspective of childhood." Estes is primarily recognized as a writer of family stories, and as one who "shaped and broadened that subgenre's tradition", primarily through her "seemingly artless style". Eleanor Cameron, in an article for The Horn Book Magazine, included Estes' Moffat books among "those that sit securely as classics in the realm of memorable literature".

Works

The Moffats (1941)
The Middle Moffat (1942)
The Sun and the Wind and Mr. Todd (1943)
Rufus M. (1943)
The Hundred Dresses (1944)
The Echoing Green (1947)
Sleeping Giant and Other Stories (1948)
Ginger Pye (1951)
A Little Oven (1955)
Pinky Pye (1958)
The Witch Family (1960)
Small but Wiry (1963)
The Alley (1964)
The Lollipop Princess (1967)
Miranda the Great (1967)
The Tunnel of Hugsy Goode (1972)
The Coat-Hanger Christmas Tree (1973)
The Lost Umbrella of Kim Chu (1978)
The Moffat Museum (1983)
The Curious Adventures of Jimmy McGee (1987)

References

Sources
Book Web Help page

External links

 Eleanor Estes at Library of Congress Authorities—with 42 catalog records
 
Eleanor Estes Papers at the University of Connecticut

1906 births
1988 deaths
American children's writers
American librarians
American women librarians
Newbery Honor winners
Newbery Medal winners
People from West Haven, Connecticut
Pratt Institute alumni
University of New Hampshire faculty
20th-century American novelists
20th-century American women writers
Novelists from Connecticut
American women academics